Route 128 is a minor state highway in northwestern Connecticut, running from U.S. Route 7 in Sharon to Route 4 in Cornwall.

Route description

Route 128 begins at an intersection with US 7 on the west bank of the Housatonic River within the town of Sharon. It heads east and immediately crosses the Housatonic River via the West Cornwall Covered Bridge (a wooden deck bridge) into the village of West Cornwall in the town of Cornwall. About  beyond the picnic area, Route 125 splits off to the south heading for Cornwall center. Route 128 continues southeast for another  until it ends at an intersection with Route 4 and Route 43 in the village of Cornwall Hollow. In Cornwall, Route 128 is known as the Sharon-Goshen Turnpike. Route 128 is a two-lane rural collector road and carries daily traffic volumes of up to 1,900.

History
The Goshen and Sharon Turnpike, a private toll road which connects Sharon center and Torrington center via West Cornwall, Cornwall Hollow and Goshen center, was chartered in May 1803. The turnpike used modern Route 4 between Torrington and Cornwall Hollow, then modern Route 128 from Cornwall Hollow to West Cornwall. Between Sharon and West Cornwall, the turnpike used West Cornwall Road.

In 1922, the portion of the old Goshen and Sharon Turnpike between West Cornwall and Cornwall Hollow, which had by now reverted to public control, was designated as a secondary state highway known as Highway 309. Route 128 was established from old Highway 309 as part of the 1932 state highway renumbering and remains unchanged since then.

Junction list

References

External links

Transportation in Litchfield County, Connecticut
128
Sharon, Connecticut
Cornwall, Connecticut
1932 establishments in Connecticut